Campanulotes elegans is a species of lice in the disputed, probably paraphyletic, family Philopteridae, the chewing lice, or in the family Goniodidae.

It is a parasite on Phaps elegans, the brush bronzewing, a species of bird in the pigeon family endemic to Australia.

References

External links
 
 

Lice
Insects described in 1978
Insects of Australia